RC-27 or Kirumampakkam-Bahour Road is a state highway in India. It starts from Kirumampakkam and ends at Bahour.

It is passing through the following village:
 Pinnachikuppam

References

External links
 Official website of Public Works Department, Puducherry UT

State highways in Puducherry
Transport in Puducherry